John Wisker (30 May 1846 in Kingston upon Hull, England – 18 January 1884 in Richmond, Victoria) was an English chess player and journalist.  By 1870, he was one of the world's ten best chess players, and the second-best English-born player, behind only Joseph Henry Blackburne.

Biography 

Born and educated at Hull, England, Wisker moved to London in 1866 to become a reporter for the City Press and befriended Howard Staunton.  His proficiency at chess improved rapidly, and he won the 1870 British Chess Championship after a play-off against Amos Burn, ahead of Joseph H. Blackburne, the defending champion. He won again in 1872 after a play-off against the first British champion, Cecil Valentine De Vere. After this second victory, the British championship was not resumed until 1904.

Wisker edited chess columns for The Sporting Times and Land and Water.  From 1872 to 1876, Wisker was Secretary of the British Chess Association and co-editor of The Chess Player's Chronicle.

After learning that he had contracted tuberculosis, Wisker emigrated to Australia in the autumn of 1876 to try to regain his health.  In Australia, he wrote a chess column for the Australasian.  In 1884, aged 37, Wisker died from bronchitis and tuberculosis in Melbourne. He is buried at the Boroondara General Cemetery.

References

External links

 

1846 births
1884 deaths
19th-century deaths from tuberculosis
English chess players
British chess writers
Journalists from Kingston upon Hull
English non-fiction writers
Sportspeople from Kingston upon Hull
English male non-fiction writers
19th-century chess players
Infectious disease deaths in Victoria (Australia)
Tuberculosis deaths in Australia
Deaths from bronchitis